Polypylis is a genus of gastropods belonging to the family Planorbidae.

The species of this genus are found in Southern and Southeastern Asia.

Species:

Polypylis almaatina 
Polypylis calathus 
Polypylis hemisphaerula 
Polypylis likharevi 
Polypylis nitidella 
Polypylis semiglobosa 
Polypylis sibirica 
Polypylis starobogatovi 
Polypylis taia 
Polypylis usta

References

Gastropods